Ramond–Neveu–Schwarz (RNS) formalism (named after Pierre Ramond, John H. Schwarz, and André Neveu) was an early attempt to introduce fermions through the means of supersymmetry into string theory. In this theory, worldsheet embedded in spacetime is regarded as a bosonic field and the fermionic fields are regarded as the vectors of spacetime.

The theory can map out tachyon through GSO projection. Also, RNS formalism is equivalent to GS formalism which has spacetime supersymmetry but without worldsheet supersymmetry.

See also
GS formalism
GSO projection
Kalb–Ramond field

References

References
 Thomas Mohaupt (2002), "Introduction to String Theory"

String theory